Sandra Lee Reeves (born October 19, 1942) is an American politician who served in the Missouri House of Representatives from 1979 to 1993.

References

1942 births
Living people
Democratic Party members of the Missouri House of Representatives
Women state legislators in Missouri